Ivan Bojović (Cyrillic: Иван Бојовић; born 17 March 1977) is a Montenegrin former football defender.

Club career
He spend most of his career playing with Belgrade's club FK Čukarički but he also played in other Serbian clubs as FK Radnički Niš and FK Voždovac, and also with Hungarian ZTE.

External sources
 Profile and stats at Srbijafudbal

1977 births
Living people
Footballers from Podgorica
Association football defenders
Serbia and Montenegro footballers
Montenegrin footballers
FK Čukarički players
Zalaegerszegi TE players
FK Radnički Niš players
FK Voždovac players
First League of Serbia and Montenegro players
Second League of Serbia and Montenegro players
Nemzeti Bajnokság I players
Serbian SuperLiga players
Serbia and Montenegro expatriate footballers
Expatriate footballers in Hungary
Serbia and Montenegro expatriate sportspeople in Hungary
Montenegrin expatriate footballers
Expatriate footballers in Serbia
Montenegrin expatriate sportspeople in Serbia